Rocky Hill is a minor hill with a small settlement, on the island of St Mary's in the Isles of Scilly, England. Nearby are Porthloo and Longstone.

References

Hamlets in the Isles of Scilly
Populated places on St Mary's, Isles of Scilly